Fleet is a town and civil parish in the Hart District of Hampshire, England, centred  WSW of London and  east of Basingstoke. It is the major town of the Hart District, and has large technology business areas, fast rail links to London, and is well connected to the M3. The Fleet built-up area has a total population of 42,835, and includes the contiguous parishes of Church Crookham, Crookham Village, Dogmersfield, and Elvetham Heath. The town has a prominent golf club, an annual half marathon, an athletics club, and four football clubs. The nearby service station on the motorway is named after the town.

Hart, of which Fleet is the main town, was voted the best place to live in the UK by the Halifax Quality of Life study in 2011, 2012, 2013, 2014, 2015, and again in 2017, above areas such as Elmbridge in Surrey and Wokingham in Berkshire. This is due to the highly affluent majority of the population, better weather and health conditions, high levels of access to leisure space, and the town's surrounding countryside which includes woodlands and the Basingstoke Canal.

Local landmarks include Fleet Pond, the largest freshwater lake in Hampshire, and a High Street with many Victorian and Edwardian buildings. Fleet holds a weekly Saturday market in Gurkha Square.

History

The site of Fleet was originally heathland in the northern part of the Crondall Hundred. The name Fleet was probably derived from the Norman French word La Flete meaning a stream or shallow water - a reference to the Fleet Pond from which fish had been taken for the monks in Winchester in Medieval times.

Early Days (to 1904) 
This north-east corner of Hampshire had shallow and sandy, slightly acidic soil, much of it boggy or covered in gorse and bracken (see Bagshot Formation). It held little use for agriculture compared to the long-grazed chalk lands and belts of alluvial areas of the rest of the county. The Fleet area has yielded few archaeological finds.
Isaac Taylor's Map of Hampshire (1759) shows three small habitations in the area that was later to become Fleet.

In 1792, the Basingstoke Canal opened. The canal passed through the town site, but apart from a few inns to serve the passing trade, it had little effect on the locality. Apart from the Farnham to Reading road, the site remained largely undeveloped until the construction of the London and South Western Railway, which opened in 1840. In that year, a church - Christ Church, which was to become the heart of the new ecclesiastical parish of Ewshot and Crookham, was built midway between the villages of Crookham and Ewshot. This parish included the area that was to become the town of Fleet. The railway company promoted Fleet Pond for a destination for day excursions, and many people came down from London to skate on the Pond during the Winter. This attracted a number of gentry, particularly retired army officers, who moved to the area bounded by Fleet Road, Elvetham Road and Reading Road North, and laid the foundations of what was to become known locally as "The Blue Triangle".

By 1860, Charles Lefroy, a local squire, commissioned All Saints' Church – in the Blue Triangle area, in memory of his wife who had died in 1857. The architect was William Burges. The ecclesiastical parish of Ewshot and Crookam was split into two in 1862, with the northern section based on All Saints' church becoming the new parish of Fleet. On 22 June 2015, the roof of All Saints' church was destroyed by fire following an arson attack.

The development of Fleet accelerated when the land to the south east of the Blue Triangle was sold for development in 1882. Development on this land was laid out in a grid pattern.

As part of the Urban District Council (1904 - 1974) 
Under the Local Government Act 1894, many of the duties that had previously been shouldered by the ecclesiastical parishes were transferred to new civil parishes, and Crookham, Fleet and Crondall each gained an elected parish council. In 1904, Fleet became an urban district, just ten years after becoming an independent parish. In 1925, and again in 1932, it expanded by taking parts of Elvetham, as a result of the Local Government Act 1929, which saw smaller urban districts merge with their surrounding rural districts, with the result that new districts emerged covering rural as well as urban parishes. As a consequence, the Fleet Urban District in 1932 expanded south of the canal and took 45% of the Crookham acreage and 61% of the population, with the rump of the parish of Crookham being returned to Crondall parish. In addition, a small area of Minley with Hawley, that consequently became the modern development of Ancells Farm, was also transferred to the expanded Fleet Urban District.

As part of the Hart District Council (1974 onwards) 
Fleet expanded over the decades, with new residential areas being built at Ancells Farm, Zebon Copse (Church Crookham, Crookham Village and Dogmersfield are included in the built-up area, as per the Government Statistical Service) and Elvetham Heath. Completed in 2008, Elvetham Heath was one of the UK's largest new housing developments at the time, and added some 3,500 inhabitants to Fleet's population, bringing its total population up to around 35,000. This represented a 20% population increase in less than a decade.

Earlier in the 1990s, two developments in Fleet involved a double opening on 10 May 1991; the Hart Shopping Centre, which was opened officially by the Duchess Of York, and the old Hart Leisure Centre on Hitches Lane. The old Hart Leisure Centre was replaced by a new one on the other side of the road in 2019.

Fleet had been a dormitory town for commuters to London. It now has several business parks, mainly occupied by Information Technology companies.

Geography
Areas and suburbs of Fleet town are Pondtail, Ancells Park and Elvetham Heath. The villages of Crookham Village and Church Crookham are contiguous with the town. Immediately surrounding towns and villages include Winchfield, Dogmersfield, Crondall, Ewshot, and Hartley Wintney.

The Fleet Pond nature reserve is a beauty spot on the northern edge of the town. Fleet Pond is the largest freshwater lake in Hampshire. Being very shallow, Fleet Pond is actively managed and needs regular dredging to avoid it silting up. In times past, the lake has frozen over, permitting skating.

Fleet is served by junction 4A of the M3 motorway. Fleet services on the M3 lies at the edge of the town. Fleet's main road, Fleet Road, runs through the town centre from south-west to north-east. Fleet railway station is on the Waterloo to Southampton main line; the train service is run by South Western Railway. Journey time to Waterloo is about 50 minutes, and express trains do the journey in under 40 minutes. Nearby airports are Blackbushe and Farnborough. The Basingstoke Canal, built at the end of the eighteenth century, connected Fleet to Basingstoke and, in the other direction, London via the Wey navigation. By the early twentieth century, the canal had fallen into disrepair, but the section between the Wey Navigation and the Greywell Tunnel has since been restored by volunteers and is maintained as a leisure facility.

Climate
Being located in South East England, Fleet has a temperate climate which is generally drier and warmer than the rest of the country.

Politics and administration
Fleet is administered by Hart District Council and Hampshire County Council. The parliamentary constituency is North East Hampshire. In April 2010, some of the responsibilities of Hart District Council were devolved to three new parish councils: Fleet Town Council, Elvetham Heath Parish Council and Church Crookham Parish Council.

Wards
Fleet and Church Crookham (which is a suburban village of the town) is divided into the following wards:

Fleet Central: Small part of the "Blue Triangle" the late Victorian/Edwardian town centre, and a small part south of the canal that was historically part of Crookham prior to 1976.
Fleet East: Pondtail, Ancells Farm and the former Pyestock site (Hartland Village). 
Fleet West: Large part of the "Blue Triangle", Elvetham Heath and Edenbrook.
Crookham East: Church Crookham estates, Velmead and the Sandy Lane Triangle.
Crookham West and Ewshot: Gally Hill, Zebon, Tweseldown, Crookham Park (formerly Queen Elizabeth Barracks), Crookham and Ewshot villages.

Demography
Men in the Fleet North ward had the second highest life expectancy at birth, 89.7 years, of any ward in England and Wales in 2016.

Education
The town has a number of schools including:
Crookham CE Infants
Fleet Infants
Heatherside Infants
Heatherside Juniors
All Saints
Tavistock Infant School
Elvetham Heath Primary School
Church Crookham Juniors
Tweseldown Infants
Velmead Junior School
Calthorpe Park School
Court Moor School
St Nicholas' School (independent, girls-only)

Transport

Rail
Fleet is served by Fleet railway station, on the South West Main Line. The station in the 2010s underwent great improvements, funded mostly by Hampshire County Council, giving the station more car parking and disabled access.

Bus
Local bus services include services operated by Stagecoach, with routes circulating the town and providing access to surrounding towns such as Farnborough and Aldershot, and a Reading Buses service connecting the Fleet to the market town of Reading, Berkshire.

Sport and leisure
Fleet is the home of the North Hants Golf Club. For over one hundred years, it has been a top-ranked course in Hampshire and nationally. Justin Rose was a junior member of the club, and there is now a meeting room named after him.

Fleet has four Non-League football teams: Fleet Town F.C., who play at Calthorpe Park, Fleet Spurs F.C., who play at Kennels Lane, Fleet Albion, who play at Dippenhall St., Crondall, and FC Fleet, who play at Zebon Copse.

Fleet has a half marathon, commonly used in preparation for the London Marathon, and an athletics club, Fleet & Crookham AC.

Media
The local press are the Fleet News & Mail, a broadsheet available in local shops, and the Surrey-Hants Star Courier, a free tabloid delivered to the door. The local BBC TV news is BBC South Today. Fleet is covered on BBC Radio by BBC Surrey, which covers North-East Hampshire additionally.

Culture
The town has numerous events organised by the local carnival committee, the largest of those being Fleet Carnival in the summer, and the switching on of the Christmas lights as December approaches (known as Fleet Festivities), usually held the last Wednesday in November and taking place along the local high-street, which is pedestrianised for the evening's events. The committee also arrange food festivals, attracting stands run by local restaurants and talks and demonstrations held in large marquees.

Other yearly events in Fleet include a Half Marathon, Fleet 10K, a beer festival organised by the local Lions Club, a Fireworks night, and the Elvetham Heath Car Show.

Gurkha Square, named after the Gurkhas who were based in Fleet for many years, houses the Fleet war memorial. A market takes place every Saturday in Gurkha Square. Major buildings on Gurkha Square are Fleet Library, and the Harlington Centre.

Fleet services

Fleet Services is a motorway service station on the M3 and is owned by Welcome Break. It was the only service station on the M3 until Winchester services was built in 2001.

Notable people
The actress Juliet Aubrey was born in Fleet in 1969.
The musician Tim Battersby was born in Fleet in 1949.
The New Zealand lawyer and naturalist Walter Buller died in Fleet in 1906.
The actress Raquel Cassidy was born in Fleet in 1968.
The musician and author Alan Clayson grew up in Fleet.
Murder victim Marion Crofts lived in Fleet.
The magazine editor, journalist and broadcaster Mark Ellen grew up in Fleet.
The professional tennis player John Feaver was born in Fleet in 1952.
The comedian, musician and actor Rob Hoey is from Fleet
The professional footballer Keith Hooker was born in Fleet in 1950.
Alison Robins (1920-2017), worked at Bletchley Park "Y-Service", born in Fleet
Patrick Hannan drummer in The Sundays was born in Fleet
The golfer Justin Rose was a member of the North Hants Golf Club in Fleet.
The art critic and man of letters, John Russell, was born in Fleet in 1919.
The platform diver Gemma McArthur, competitor for Team Scotland in the 2018 Commonwealth Games, is from Fleet.
 The racing driver Jac Constable, who won the AM class of the Ginetta GT4 Supercup in 2018 grew up and lives in Fleet.
 The racing driver Dan Welch, who competed in the British Touring Car Championship between 2011 and 2018 lives in Fleet.
 The racing driver Jack Mitchell, who won the GT4 class of the British GT Championship in 2018 lives in Fleet.

See also
Basingstoke Canal

References

External links
 Fleet Town Council

 
Towns in Hampshire
Civil parishes in Hampshire
Hart District